Arthur Pougin ( 6 August 1834 – 8 August 1921) was a French musical and dramatic critic and writer. He was born at Châteauroux (Indre) and studied music at the Conservatoire de Paris under Alard (violin) and Reber (harmony). In 1855 he became conductor at the Théâtre Beaumarchais, and afterward leader at Musard's concerts, subconductor at the Folies-Nouvelles, and from 1860 to 1863 he was first violin at the Opéra-Comique. He was in turn feuilletoniste to Le Soir, La Tribune, L'Événement and Le Journal Officiel, besides being a frequent contributor to all the important French musical periodicals. His work in connection with Fétis's Biographie universelle, for which he prepared a supplement (two volumes, 1878–80), has, however, been found to be lacking in thoroughness. He edited the new edition of Clément and Larousse's Dictionnaire lyrique.

Pougin died in Paris at age 87.

References
 

1834 births
1921 deaths
People from Châteauroux
French music critics
French literary critics
19th-century French journalists
20th-century French journalists
French male non-fiction writers
Conservatoire de Paris alumni
Music historians
19th-century French male classical violinists